This is a list of dance categories, different types, styles, or genres of dance.

For older and more region-oriented vernacular dance styles, see List of ethnic, regional, and folk dances by origin. African and American 
Bolojo
Cakewalk
Patting juba
Stepping
Stick dance
Tap dancing
Kizomba
Kompa
Jazz dance
Moonwalk

 Ceremonial dance 
 Haka
 Kagura
 Ritual dances of China
 Sacred dance  
Cham dance
Drametse Ngacham
Prophetic dance
Rejang dance
Sanghyang
Sufi whirling
Worship dance

 Disco / Electronic dance 

 Boogaloo and Electric boogaloo (Electric boogie)
 Bump
 Cutting shapes
 Waacking
 Free step
 Hustle
 Jumpstyle
 Penguin
 Robot
 Watergate
  Go-go

 Free and improvised dance 
 Bogo lelo dance
 Contact improvisation
 Dance improvisation
 Ecstatic dance
 Free dance
 Fusion dance
 Interpretive dance
 Modern dance

 Historical dance 
 Ballet
 Baroque dance
 Medieval dance
 Regency dance
 Renaissance dance
 Ultapulta

 Latin / Rhythm 

 American Rhythm
 Bolero willy
 East Coast Swing
 Mambo
 Rumba
 Bachata
 Cha Cha
 Corridos
 Cumbia
 Duranguense
 Forró
 International Latin
 Argentine tango
 Capoeira
 Maculelê
 Danza
 Jive
 Merengue
 Milonga
 Reggaeton
 Rumba
 Rueda
 Salsa
 Samba (ballroom dance)
 Samba (Brazilian dance)
 Samba de Gafieira
 Zouk
 Pasodoble
 Quebradita
 Samba de roda
 Samba enredo
 Tejano dance
 Zapateado:
 Zapateado (Mexico)
 Zapateado (Spain)

 Novelty and fad dances 

 Animal dance
 Bossa Nova
 Bunny hop
 Conga line
 Freddie
 Frug
 Hitch hike
 Lambada
 Madison
 Mule
 Pony
 The Shake
 Turkey trot
 Twist
 Watusi

 Social dance 
 Country dance, Contra dance
 Participation dance
 Solo dance
 Partner dance
 Group dance
 Circle dance
 Line dance
 Round dance
 Square dance

 Street dance 

 Hip-hop dance
 Breakdancing
 Cabbage patch dance
 Cat Daddy
 Dougie
 Electric boogaloo
 Gangsta Walking
 Harlem shake
 Jerkin'
 Locking
 Popping
 Turfing
 Uprock
 House dance
 Footwork
 Vogue
 Electro dance
 Flexing
 Krumping
 Litefeet
 Lyrical hip-hop
 Robot dance
 Jaywalk
  majorette

 Swing dance 

 Balboa
 Big Apple
 Black Bottom
 Blues dance
 Boogie-woogie
 Breakaway
 Bugg
 Carolina Shag
 Charleston
 Collegiate Shag
 East Coast Swing
 Hand dancing
 Hand Jive
 Jitterbug
 Jive
 Jumpin' Joe
 Leroc
 Lindy Hop
 Modern Jive
 Rock and Roll
 Single Swing
 Skip jive
 St. Louis Shag
 West Coast Swing
 Western Swing

 Other 

 Acro dance
 Calypso
 Concert dance
 Contemporary dance
 Fire dance
 Flamenco
 Flying Men Dance
 K-POP
 Liturgical dance
 Lyrical dance
 Pole dance
 Vintage dance

References

Further reading

 Carter, A. (1998) The Routledge Dance Studies Reader. Routledge. 
 Sharp, C. J. (1924) The dance; an historical survey of dancing in Europe. Rowman and Littlefield. 
 Thomas, H. (2003) The Body, Dance and Cultural Theory. Palgrave Macmillan. 
 Feliksdal, B (2003) Modern Tap Dance,  Bekebooks
 Feliksdal, B (2004) Jazz Dance Syllabus Jazz, Rhythm, Body and Soul.  Bekebooks. Amsterdam, The Netherlands, Flamenco
 Feliksdal, B (2009) Urban Dance-Jazzdans'',  Bekebooks. Amsterdam, Netherlands
 Shipter Fan, B (2009) "Urban Dance-Jazzdans", Bekebooks. Amsterdam, Netherlands

Style categories, List of dance